Dieter Seiz (born 20 March 1938) is a German water polo player. He competed in the men's tournament at the 1960 Summer Olympics.

References

External links
 

1938 births
Living people
German male water polo players
Olympic water polo players of the United Team of Germany
Water polo players at the 1960 Summer Olympics
People from Ludwigsburg (district)
Sportspeople from Stuttgart (region)